The 1989 Virginia Slims of Albuquerque was a women's tennis tournament played on outdoor hard courts in Albuquerque, New Mexico in the United States that was part of the Category 2 tier of the 1989 WTA Tour. It was the inaugural edition of the tournament and was held from August 14 through August 20, 1989.  Lori McNeil won the singles title.

Finals

Singles

 Lori McNeil defeated  Elna Reinach 6–1, 6–3
 It was McNeil's 4th title of the year and the 22nd of her career.

Doubles

 Nicole Provis /  Elna Reinach defeated  Raffaella Reggi /  Arantxa Sánchez Vicario 4–6, 6–4, 6–2
 It was Provis' only title of the year and the 2nd of her career. It was Reinach's only title of the year and the 1st of her career.

External links
 ITF tournament edition details
 Tournament draws

Virginia Slims of Albuquerque
Virginia Slims of Albuquerque
1989 in New Mexico
1989 in American tennis